Mort's End  is a popular webshow found on Blip.tv that began in early 2009 and will have its final season in 2010. The show originally aired its first episode back when it was necessary to download each individual episode. Now, with a home on Blip, the audience can watch whichever episode they want. During its two season run, the show has gained a wide cult following among those who visit the website and those who come across the viral marketing.

It has been stated that the third season will be its last and will also include a possible musical episode with original songs. Also, a spin-off series is in development involving the adventures of one of its main characters. The show is to be entitled Nick!

The show that was simply titled "Nick" never came along, but there was a new series to take the place of the original series called "The Lost Transmissions." Which can also be seen at the very same Blip page. This plot follows the same cast of characters as they travel through the multiverse to get Mort back to his time period to stop what caused the last series to end. Which brings up the question, what will happen after The Lost Transmissions is over?

History 

The idea of Mort's End came from drawing an image on paint, then attempting to animate by cutting the frames down. When that eventually failed, it turned into more of a Tom Goes to the Mayor type show where the dialogue was most of the humor and when the characters did move, it was from position to position. Made using Windows Movie Maker and the free audio software Audacity (mainly for lowering the pitch of Sheffield's voice), the first season of Mort's End was clunky and poorly drawn. On the second season, the creator began using Sony Vegas editing software and was able to bring some brilliant editing techniques into the show, but would still mostly remain on the completely improvised dialogue to give the plot to each episode. The third and Final season came along using the same techniques. For "The Lost Transmissions" the format changed a little bit as it was rendered into 720p High-Definition.

Plot 

The story picks up with Mort at the base of a mountain which he has aptly named "Mount Pointy Nipple". Mort, a green faced character with a strange haircut talks directly into the camera filming his whole life after "the event". Suddenly an African American man comes up from behind him. Up until this point, Mort had not seen anyone for years. This new contact is named Sheffield, and his back story starts the entire adventure.

The adventure goes from Mount Pointy Nipple to Sheffield's Home town in "Leesiana" to find his long lost love, Gloria who he lost before the event occurred after a mix up put them into separate safety houses.

So Mort, Sheffield, and Nick, whom they met after leaving their camera behind by accident, all set out for Leesiana where hilarious characters and antics ensue.

In the second season, the adventure continues with Sheffield, Nick, and Mort heading to Europe still in pursuit of Gloria, Sheffield's love. They cross the great wide ocean to finally get to where they believe Gloria to be. Another season of hilarious adventures, and rock and roll karaoke.

Airing the final season 

The final season will begin airing in 2010, most likely in January, and will follow them back to Mount Pointy Nipple to wed Gloria and Sheffield.

Mort's End: The Lost Transmission 

A few months after the final episode of Mort's End aired, people wondered what would happen after the series. If it would go on, or if it was completely over. Well, according to the Mort's End facebook fanpage, the series would go off into a new tangent in its new series Mort's End: The Lost Transmissions.

The original air date for this show was to be on June, 7th 2010. Due to some problems with the creators, it has been pushed back to an unknown date. The production office is being moved to a new location, so there has been some troubles creating new episodes.

Although the series has now been started and went into the first seasons 3 episodes before beginning a 3-month hiatus. Now, back for the rest of the season, starting with the Halloween episode where the gang travels to "The Zombieverse".

Soundtrack 

The eclectic selection of music from Mort's End ranges from the very well known to local bands which no one has heard—mostly hard rock, and some lighter stuff such as Simon and Garfunkel.

Episode list

Trivia 

 Most of the dialogue done on the show is improvised. The only thing scripted is the special guests lines.
 Some of the comical references and homages range from Curb your Enthusiasm to Meat Loaf's I'd Do Anything for Love (But I Won't Do That)
 The character's voices tend to change from time to time.
 Seymour, a dog in the episode "Half and Half" and seen again in the Christmas Special, is Alex's real dog. He also has his own video series.
 The Improvised lines can sometimes be messed up, generally these are kept for comedic purposes.
 Using the editing program Sony Vegas, there is some real footage from YouTube. Examples are the fireplace in the Christmas Episode, and what was on the TV in the 9th episode of season 2.

References

External links 
 Mort's End show

American adult animated web series